Rhoel Gallardo, CMF (November 29, 1965 – May 3, 2000) was a Roman Catholic Claretian missionary martyred in Basilan, the Philippines.

Early life and education
Gallardo was born in November 29, 1965 in Olongapo, Zambales, Philippines. He was the second child among five siblings. In 1988, Gallardo decided to be a priest joining the Claretian Order. He took his first vows the following year and was ordained a priest in 1994.

Ministry
Gallardo's last assignment was at the Roman Catholic parish of Tumahubong in Sumisip, Basilan. He volunteered to be assigned to that parish.

Kidnapping and death
In March 20, 2000, Abu Sayyaf militants stormed the Claret School compound in Tumahubong, Basilan. The group burned the school, and abducted people in the area including teachers and students. Gallardo who resides in a mission house inside the complex was among who was captured. The captives were kept in Punoh Mahadji and on May 3, 2000 they were brought out of the site; reportedly being planned to be transferred to Sulu. At one point, the male and female captives were separated from each other. Gallardo along with three teachers and five students were found dead. Gallardo's body was found to be riddled with three bullet wounds caused by close-range shots, and had his nails removed.

Legacy
The Claretians have opened a cause for Gallardo's beatification as a martyr of the Catholic Church on May 3, 2021. Among his noted acts was during his kidnapping; he is testified to have protected his co-captives and prevented the rape of women, and gave spiritual support such as praying the rosary together with the other captives. He reportedly was asked to denounce his Catholic faith but refused. He is also noted to have fostered Christian-Muslim relations in Basilan.

References 

1965 births
2000 deaths
People from Olongapo
Claretians
Filipino Servants of God
20th-century venerated Christians

20th-century Filipino Roman Catholic priests
Filipino murder victims
People murdered in the Philippines
Deaths by firearm in the Philippines
20th-century Roman Catholic martyrs